States have passed state equal rights amendments (ERAs) to their constitutions that provide various degrees of legal protection against discrimination based on sex. With some mirroring the broad language and guarantees of the proposed Federal Equal Rights Amendment, others more closely resemble the Equal Protection Clause of the Fourteenth Amendment.

The standard of review that a court applies in evaluating a discriminatory claim mandates the level of protection guaranteed, ranging from the most rigorous strict scrutiny, intermediate standard or the least-stringent rational basis review. Courts reflect on the unique legislative history and development, intent, status of public policy and related precedent in deciding the scope of legal safeguards afforded to sex discrimination, resulting in differences between state and federal jurisprudence.

A Supreme Court decision found that sex discrimination claims under the Fourteenth Amendment's Equal Protection Clause are reviewed under the middle-tier intermediate scrutiny, based on the formal equality analysis of federal precedent. While some state courts have adopted this reading of their own equality provisions, most others with equal rights or equal protection language have regarded these clauses as requiring strict scrutiny.

Expanded state protection 
While around twenty states have ruled provisions in their state constitutions expand the protection guaranteed to sex discrimination, some have read their ERAs to mandate a nearly absolutist approach or to apply strict scrutiny. Certain aspects frequently conflicting with federal protection are questions of facially-neutral laws and disparate impact, state action, whether sex is deemed a suspect classification, and different treatment because of unique biological traits.

For example, states such as Pennsylvania, Colorado, Washington, Maryland and Massachusetts have some of the most stringent protection, their courts ruling the main intent of the ERA was to abolish using sex to make legal distinctions and allocate benefits. Others, such as New Mexico, have a complete prohibition against using classifications involving a physical trait unique to either sex or result in disadvantaging either women or men.

State vs. private action 
Fourteenth Amendment guarantees are only applied to the actions executed by state actors, and does not cover purely private discriminatory actions. Many states have interpreted their ERAs as prohibiting sex discrimination performed by private entities as well as state actors, extending the scope of protection.

Disparate impact 
Courts treat a challenged action differently if it is sex-neutral, or contains no explicit use of sex classifications, but results in adverse impact disproportionately burdening one sex more harshly than the other. As ruled in Village of Arlington Heights v. Metropolitan Housing Development Corp., federal jurisprudence refuses to apply the more protective intermediate scrutiny to gender-neutral acts without direct proof sex discrimination is the purpose of the act. In contrast, some state courts have interpreted their ERAs to even protect against sex-neutral acts that have a disproportionate adverse impact on one gender by applying a heightened standard of review.

States adopting federal model of equalities 
Fewer states have interpreted their ERAs as mandating a degree of protection more closely resembling the federal guarantees against sex discrimination. For example, Virginia, Rhode Island, Florida and Utah courts have ruled their constitutions only mandate an intermediate standard of review, mirroring the Equal Protection Clause analysis.

In concluding the constitution's equality protection is not a "true ERA," the Rhode Island courts have accepted this middle-tier scrutiny, citing the unique history and intent of the legislature as justification."

List of state constitutions containing ERAs
State equal rights amendments and original constitutional equal rights provisions:

Table of protected classes

States where state-level ERAs have passed at least one house
 Maine: A state-level ERA passed the Maine House of Representatives on February 15, 2022.
Minnesota: A state-level ERA passed the Minnesota House of Representatives on March 7, 2019.ERA Minnesota
New York: A state-level ERA passed the New York State Legislature on July 1, 2022, and was passed again on January 24, 2023. The measure would amend Article 1, Section 11 of the New York Constitution to include ethnicity, national origin, age, disability, and sex — including their sexual orientation, gender identity, gender expression, pregnancy and pregnancy outcomes. The measure will appear as a referendum on the November 2024 ballot.

References

History of women's rights in the United States
Second-wave feminism
States of the United States law-related lists